Anarak-e Bala (also Romanized as Anārak-e Bālā; also known as Anārak) is a village in Gavkan Rural District, in the Central District of Rigan County, Kerman Province, Iran. At the 2006 census, its population was 50, in 9 families.

References 

Populated places in Rigan County